The Hurden ship canal is a  long canal in the Swiss canton of Schwyz. It connects the lower section of Lake Zürich with the upper section, sometimes called the Obersee, permitting shipping services on the lake to pass between the two halves of the lake without passing through the shallows, and under the low bridges, of the Seedamm. The canal was opened in 1943, and cuts through the base of the peninsular containing the village of Hurden, thus placing the centre of the village on an artificial island.

The canal is spanned by the Sternenbrücke, which carries both road and railway, with the railway being used by the S5 and S40 lines of the S-Bahn Zürich and by the Südostbahn Voralpen Express. This bridge was renewed between March and November 2010 to allow 40 ton trucks to cross the Seedamm.

The canal's navigation channel is only wide enough to pass a single ship at a time, and vessels proceeding up the lake must give way to vessels proceeding downstream. Amongst other vessels, it is used by the paddle steamers and motor ships of the Zürichsee-Schifffahrtsgesellschaft on their services from the city of Zürich to the Obersee.

To the west of the Sternenbrücke, the canal passes through the Frauenwinkel nature reserve, with its important bog landscape.

Gallery

References

External links 
 

Canals in Switzerland
Canals opened in 1943
Ship canals
Transport in the canton of Schwyz